The 1994–95 Midland Football Combination season was the 58th in the history of Midland Football Combination, a football competition in England.

Premier Division

The Premier Division featured eleven clubs which competed in the division last season, along with seven new clubs:
Clubs promoted from Division One:
Handrahan Timbers
Olton Royale
Sherwood Celtic
Shirley Town
Upton Town
West Midlands Fire Service

Plus:
Alvechurch Villa

League table

References

1994–95
9